Omar Shegewi or Sheghewi (unknown-1928) was a Libyan resistance leader who fought against Italian colonization.  Shegewi came from the town of Hun in central Libya. He was sentenced to death and executed by hanging by the Italian forces led by Rodolfo Graziani after 'The Battle of Afia'.
He was married to Zuhra Ramdan Agha Al-Awji and had three children: Mohammed Shegewi, Hassan Shegewi and Idris Shegewi.

References

Libyan Muslims
Libyan resistance leaders
People from Hun, Libya
People executed by Italy by hanging
Executed Libyan people
1928 deaths
Italy–Libya relations
Year of birth missing